Jean Laborde (9 December 1918 – 30 January 2007)  was a French journalist and writer.

Personal life 
He was born in Lyon in December 9th, 1918, and studied law at university before commencing his career as a journalist. He died in Biarritz in January 30th, 2007, aged 88.

Career 
At the request of Pierre Lazareff, Jean became the judicial reporter of the France Soir in 1945. While in this role, he covered several famous cases, among them the Victor Kravchenko case, the Marie Besnard case and the Gustave Dominici case. From 1964, he was the chief law correspondent of L'Aurore. He quit in 1978 as a result of conflict with the new owner Le Figaro.

He wrote some twenty books, under his own name and pen names such as Jean Delion and Raf Vallet. Several of his books were adapted for the cinema. In addition, he co-wrote the screenplay of Peur sur la ville, directed by Henri Verneuil in 1975.

Works

Books 
 Amour, que de crimes (1954) 
 Un homme à part entière (1961) 
 L'Héritage de violence (1969) (winner of the Maison de la Presse Prize)
 Le Moindre Mal (1971) 
 Heureux les corrompus (1974)

Theater 

 Peur sur la ville, directed by Henri Verneuil in 1975

Movie Adaptations 
 Les Bonnes Causes (1960), directed by Christian-Jaque in 1963
 La Seconde Vérité, directed by Christian-Jaque in 1966 
 Les Assassins de l'ordre (1956), directed by Marcel Carné in 1971
 Le Pacha directed  by Georges Lautner in 1968
 Mort d'un pourri, also directed by Georges Lautner in 1977.

References

French writers
1918 births
2007 deaths